Nikolaos "Nikos" Sofis (Greek: Νικόλαος "Νίκος" Σοφής; born 10 May 1992 in Munich, Germany), is a Greek sports manager and lyricist, from Larissa, Greece. He used to serve as vice president for Greek Super League club AEL and as an advisor to Super League 2 club Kavala. Since 2011, he also is engaged in songwriting, best known for his bids in the Eurovision Song Contest. In 2019, together with Sebastian Ekstrand, he formed the EDM pop project VoColor.

Personal life 
Born in Munich, Germany, and growing up close by to Frankfurt, he attended the Frankfurt International School from where he graduated in 2011. In 2013, he attended the EU Business School in Barcelona, Spain, where he began his sports management studies. In 2014, he continued his studies at the American College of Greece in Athens from where he obtained a bachelor's degree in 2018. He is fluent in Greek, German, and English.

Sports management

AE Vounaina 
2014–2015

Sofis was appointed as second vice president at the beginning of the sixth tiered B' EPSL 2014–15 season, due to his sports management studies. Having been relegated in the previous season, the aim of the team and the new governing body was to return the team to the fifth tiered A1 EPSL. The team quickly managed to deliver results, assuring Vounaina winning the B' EPSL at the end of the season, returning to A1 EPSL as planned. Sofis resigned from his position on 9 March 2015.

2016–2019

For the 2016–17 A1 EPSL season, Sofis returned to the board of AE Vounaina. In his first season back with the team, Vounaina barely missed out, finishing third, on promoting to the fourth tiered A' EPSL. However, on 10 August 2017, it got announced that Vounaina got promoted to the A' EPSL, due to another team not submitting their license. This marks the first time Vounaina will be playing in the highest amateur league.

In the A' EPSL 2017–18 season, and as newcomers to the highest Greek amateur division, AE Vounaina faced several issues throughout the whole season and were relegated back to the A1 EPSL, after going through the relegation playoffs.

Back in the A1 EPSL, the 2018–19 season was meant to bring the team back up to the A' EPSL, which also looked like a goal to be achieved, but during the second half of the season things didn't work out as planned. The team ended up in fourth position, thus barely missing out on the three promotion spots.

During the 2019–20 season, the focus was heavily set on returning the team to top amateur division. On 7 June 2019, it was announced that Sofis took charge as caretaker president. Vounaina, as the big favorite of the category, started the season as expected and won match after match. With the team performing steadily, Sofis announced his resignation from the position he was holding on 11 November 2019, stating that the team is on a secure path and that it's "the right time to step down and give on the presidency".

AEL 
2016–2018

On 9 September 2016, Greek Super League team AEL proposed the inclusion of Sofis into the executive board to its stakeholders. As of 24 September 2016, Sofis has been elected and announced as third vice president. The team managed to reach the goals set by the administrative board, which expected the team to not get relegated and remain in the Superleague.

During the 2017–18 season, AEL managed an impressive run in the Greek Cup, making it to the semifinals. The team was eventually eliminated by AEK Athens through the away goals rule. On 4 October 2017, Sofis announced his resignation as vice president. However, on 24 November 2017, Sofis got announced as member of the newly formed executive board. On 23 September 2018, Sofis announced his resignation from the position he was holding at the club.

Kavala 
From 1 January 2022 until 30 June 2022, Sofis has been acting as an advisor to Super League 2 club Kavala.

Songwriting 

Since 2011, Sofis also has been engaged in songwriting, best known for his bids in the Eurovision Song Contest. During the years he has collaborated with a variety of songwriters and artists from across Europe. As of 2019, he also is the main lyricist for Polish rock band Clödie. Since March 2021, he collaborates with Italian record label Frontiers Music.

Entries in Eurovision Song Contest pre-selections

Additional contest participations

Further songwriting credits

VoColor 

VoColor was a Swedish-Greek EDM pop project formed in 2019, consisting of Swedish singer-songwriter Sebastian Ekstrand and Greek lyricist Nikos Sofis.

Ekstrand and Sofis first met and started working in early-2016, resulting in Ekstrand's solo single "Come To Me". With both sides being satisfied with the collaboration, Sofis involved Ekstrand on the song "If I Could" for Moldovan artist Max Fall, a song that was submitted to represent Moldova in the Eurovision Song Contest 2017. The same year, the two worked on Ekstrand's next solo single, "Hold On". During the same year, Ekstrand involved Sofis into the writing process of Escape the Day's comeback single "Breaking the Tide", released in early-2018. Ekstrand and Sofis have also worked together on the song "Hypnotized", released in 2018, by popular Azerbaijani pop star Samra. In 2019, Ekstrand and Sofis collaborated once again and wrote the song "Stop Breathing" for Angelika Pushnova, who tried to represent Belarus in the Eurovision Song Contest 2019.

In late-2019, Ekstrand and Sofis decided to form VoColor and released their debut single "Savior" on 6 December 2019. Following the release of the debut single, on 10 April 2020 VoColor released the remix EP, Savior: Remixed, containing five alternate versions of the song. On 22 May 2020, they released their second single, "Until the End", featuring Eurovision Song Contest 2011 winner Eldar from Azerbaijan. An orchestral remix of "Until the End" was released on 4 December. On New Year's Eve, VoColor released the Until the End EP, containing all of the previously released versions of the song as well as the previously unreleased instrumental version. On 24 September 2021, they released their third single "Home" with Danish singer Kenny Duerlund. On 17 June 2022, the duo released their fourth single "Illogical".

Members 

 Sebastian Ekstrand – vocals, production (2019–2023)
 Nikos Sofis – lyrics, production (2019–2023)

Discography

Extended plays 

 2020: Savior: Remixed
2020: Until the End

Singles 
2019: "Savior"
2020: "Until the End" (with Eldar)
2021: "Home" (with Kenny Duerlund)
2022: "Illogical"

Promotional singles 

 2020: "Savior (RÆVHEN Remix)"
 2020: "Until the End (Zerotonine Remix)" (with Eldar)
 2020: "Until the End (Austin Leeds Remix)" (with Eldar)
2020: "Until the End (Orchestral Remix)" (with Eldar)
2022: "Home (Neutrophic Remix)" (with Kenny Duerlund)

References

External links 
 Facebook
 SoundCloud

1992 births
Living people
Greek lyricists
People from Darmstadt (region)